The 1957 Soviet Cup was an association football cup competition of the Soviet Union.

Competition schedule

Preliminary stage

Group 1

Quarterfinals
 [Apr 28] 
 TORPEDO Stalingrad            3-1  Avangard Kharkov 
   [P.Popov 29, V.Smirnov 53, 71 – A.Voronin 70] 
 [May 1] 
 TORPEDO Taganrog              3-1  Avangard Leningrad 
   [Vl.Kutushov, V.Nechayev, L.Morozov – V.Khrapovitskiy]

Semifinals
 [Apr 30] 
 TORPEDO Rostov-na-Donu        2-1  Lokomotiv Saratov 
   [V.Ponedelnik, G.Koloskov – A.Glinskiy] 
 [May 1] 
 METALLURG Zaporozhye          7-0  Khimik Yaroslavl 
   [Turyanitsa-3, Bondar-2, Zozulya, P.Ponomaryov] 
 SHAKHTYOR Kadiyevka           3-2  Neftyanik Krasnodar              [aet] 
   [Belykh-2, Abkhazava – Gogichaishvili, Zanchenko] 
 Trudoviye Rezervy Stavropol   1-3  DOF Sevastopol 
   [K.Zibrov – Sklyarov, Ananyev, Krotkov] 
 [May 2] 
 KRASNOYE ZNAMYA Ivanovo       2-0  Burevestnik Leningrad 
   [N.Yefimov 23, A.Kachayev 58] 
 Krylya Sovetov Voronezh       1-1  Trudoviye Rezervy Voroshilovgrad 
   [Ilyukhin 70 – Belyayev 60] 
 TORPEDO Gorkiy                4-1  Neftyanik Grozny 
   [L.Fedotov-2, Polovinkin, Lapkin – Serednyakov] 
 [May 5] 
 Torpedo Stalingrad            0-2  TORPEDO Taganrog 
   [Simonov 12, Borisenko ?]

Semifinals replays
 [May 3] 
 KRYLYA SOVETOV Voronezh       6-1  Trudoviye Rezervy Voroshilovgrad 
   [Smotrikin 4, 56, Gornostayev 14, 17, ?, Radin 64 – Khramtsov ? pen]

Final
 [May 5] 
 KRASNOYE ZNAMYA Ivanovo       3-1  Torpedo Rostov-na-Donu 
   [Y.Bologov 38, V.Rubilov 65, A.Kachayev ? – A.Grigorov ?] 
 SHAKHTYOR Kadiyevka           2-1  DOF Sevastopol 
   [Rozhkov, Abkhazava – Batanov] 
 [May 6] 
 METALLURG Zaporozhye          3-1  Krylya Sovetov Voronezh 
   [Bondar-2, Turyanitsa – Gornostayev] 
 [May 14] 
 TORPEDO Gorkiy                2-0  Torpedo Taganrog 
   [Silkin, Polovinkin]

Group 2

Quarterfinals
 [May 1] 
 AVANGARD Nikolayev            2-0  Spartak Vilnius 
   [Polivoda 25, Belyak 29] 
 [May 2] 
 Metallurg Dnepropetrovsk      2-2  Spartak Uzhgorod 
   [Didevich-2 – S.Sabo, A.Tsitsei]

Quarterfinals replays
 [May 3] 
 METALLURG Dnepropetrovsk      3-0  Spartak Uzhgorod 
   [Maidyuk-2 Savinov]

Semifinals
 [May 1] 
 DINAMO Tallinn                2-1  Krylya Sovetov Stupino 
   [Fyodorov (K) og, Mikhailov – Ivanyuk] 
 KOLHOSPNIK Poltava            2-1  SKVO Kiev 
   [A.Matyukhin, V.Kazankin – G.Putevskiy] 
 PISHCHEVIK Kaliningrad        1-0  Urozhai Minsk                    [aet] 
   [D.Solovyov 102] 
 Shakhtyor Stalinogorsk        0-2  SPARTAK Stanislav 
   [Golovei 34, 68] 
 SKVO Lvov                     2-0  Pishchevik Odessa 
   [A.Kurchavenkov, A.Filyayev] 
 TRUDOVIYE REZERVY Leningrad   3-0  Khimik Dneprodzerzhinsk 
   [Kolobov, M.Ivanov, Tsvetkov] 
 [May 2] 
 Daugava Riga                  0-3  AVANGARD Sormovo 
   [Knyazev, Doronin, Shikunov] 
 [May 5] 
 METALLURG Dnepropetrovsk      2-1  Avangard Nikolayev 
   [Dergach ?, Didevich 83 – Kolokolnikov 7]

Final
 [May 5] 
 DINAMO Tallinn                1-0  Trudoviye Rezervy Leningrad 
   [Sepp 79] 
 Pishchevik Kaliningrad        1-4  SPARTAK Stanislav 
   [Kovalevskiy pen – Zhuravlyov-2, Lautner, M.Dumanskiy] 
 SKVO Lvov                     1-0  Kolhospnik Poltava 
   [A.Kurchavenkov 50] 
 [Jun 14] 
 Metallurg Dnepropetrovsk      2-4  AVANGARD Sormovo 
   [Y.Balykin, L.Savinov – Shikunov, Sysalov, Doronin, Knyazev]

Group 3

Quarterfinals
 [Mar 27] 
 OSK Tbilisi                   3-2  Spartak Yerevan 
   [T.Melashvili, D.Khundadze, V.Antonyan (S) og – M.Semerjan-2] 
 [May 1] 
 Krylya Sovetov Molotov        2-4  KAYRAT Alma-Ata 
   [Hamidullin, Karetnikov (Ka) og – Bolotov-2, Krasnov, Leonov] 
 LOKOMOTIV Chelyabinsk         2-0  Spartak Frunze 
   [Sinitsyn, Vasilyev] 
 Urozhai Stalinabad            0-3  LOKOMOTIV Kutaisi 
 ZENIT Izhevsk                 2-0  Kolhozchi Ashkhabad 
   [Mokiyenko, Rogov] 
 [May 2] 
 DINAMO Kirov                  2-1  Neftyanik Baku 
   [Biryukov, Shulyatyev – Askerov] 
 Neftyanik Ufa                 1-2  AVANGARD Sverdlovsk 
   [I.Parulava ? – M.Laptev (N) 51 og, G.Korobeinikov 60] 
 [May 3] 
 OSK Sverdlovsk                2-0  Pahtakor Tashkent 
   [Tufatullin, Cheryomushkin]

Semifinals
 [May 5] 
 KAYRAT Alma-Ata               1-0  OSK Tbilisi                      [aet]      
   [V.Bolotov] 
 OSK Sverdlovsk                2-1  Dinamo Kirov 
   [Gladkikh, Potaskuyev – V.Yershov] 
 [May 6] 
 AVANGARD Sverdlovsk           3-1  Zenit Izhevsk                    [aet] 
   [E.Chernoivanov 37, V.Krasnov 94, V.Silantyev 107 – V.Grachov 45] 
 [May 8] 
 LOKOMOTIV Chelyabinsk         1-0  Lokomotiv Kutaisi 
   [V.Nechayev]

Final
 [May 19] 
 OSK Sverdlovsk                0-0  Avangard Sverdlovsk 
 [Jun 2] 
 KAYRAT Alma-Ata               4-2  Lokomotiv Chelyabinsk            [aet] 
   [L.Ostroushko, S.Gnuni, V.Bolotov, V.Sinitsyn (L) og – I.Vasilyev, V.Sinitsyn]

Final replays
 [May 20] 
 OSK Sverdlovsk                3-1  Avangard Sverdlovsk 
   [G.Neverov 4, 65, V.Potaskuyev 31 – V.Belousov 39 pen]

Group 4

Quarterfinals
 [May 8] 
 SKVO Khabarovsk               w/o  Burevestnik Tomsk 
 [May 12] 
 SKVO Chita                    3-0  Urozhai Barnaul 
   [Veledinskiy 15, 70, Mayorov ?]

Semifinals
 [May 12] 
 DINAMO Vladivostok            1-0  SKVO Khabarovsk 
   [Ryabtsev 19] 
 SibSelMash Novosibirsk        1-2  SHAKHTYOR Kemerovo               [aet] 
   [N.Kuchanov – Yegorov, Kadkin] 
 [May 19] 
 Energiya Irkutsk              2-3  KRASNAYA ZVEZDA Omsk 
   [Y.Galyato, V.Lutovinov – M.Kostyakov-2, V.Ledovskikh] 
 SKVO Chita                    0-2  METALLURG Stalinsk 
   [Bykov, I.Mishin]

Final
 [May 19] 
 SHAKHTYOR Kemerovo            2-0  Dinamo Vladivostok 
   [V.Yegorov-2] 
 [May 26] 
 METALLURG Stalinsk            1-0  Krasnaya Zvezda Omsk 
   [V.Syurkayev]

Final stage

First round
 [May 24] 
 OSK Sverdlovsk                0-2  LOKOMOTIV Moskva 
   [Valentin Bubukin 55, Ivan Morgunov 82] 
 [May 25] 
 Shakhtyor Kemerovo            1-6  ZENIT Leningrad 
   [S.Gultikov – Stanislav Zavidonov-3, Alexandr Ivanov-2, Vladimir Vinogradov] 
 [Jun 23] 
 AVANGARD Sormovo              4-2  Burevestnik Kishinev 
   [Shipunov-2, Timonin, Butylkin (B) og – Eduard Danilov, Yuriy Korotkov] 
 [Jul 8] 
 Krasnoye Znamya Ivanovo       0-2  TORPEDO Moskva 
   [Yuriy Falin 27, 44] 
 [Jul 13] 
 Shakhtyor Kadiyevka           0-5  DINAMO Tbilisi 
   [Avtandil Gogoberidze-2, Shota Yamanidze, Boris Khasaia, Alexei Kvlividze] 
 [Jul 14] 
 Kayrat Alma-Ata               1-2  DINAMO Kiev 
   [Mazmanidi 68 – Mikhail Koman 25, Viktor Fomin 47] 
 [Jul 15] 
 Metallurg Zaporozhye          0-4  DINAMO Moskva 
   [Alekper Mamedov 1, 86, Vladimir Ryzhkin 33, Genrikh Fedosov 80] 
 [Jul 17] 
 Dinamo Tallinn                1-2  SPARTAK Minsk 
   [B.Mikhailov 46 – Alexandr Chikhladze 28, Leonid Yerokhovets 42]

Second round
 [Jun 5] 
 SKVO Lvov                     1-2  SPARTAK Moskva 
   [A.Kurchavenkov 32 – Anatoliy M.Ilyin 75, Nikita Simonyan 78] 
 [Jun 16] 
 SPARTAK Stanislav             1-0  Krylya Sovetov Kuibyshev 
   [Zhuravlyov 2] 
 [Jun 21] 
 Torpedo Gorkiy                2-5  SHAKHTYOR Stalino 
   [Savin-2 – Boris Rossikhin-2, Valentin Sapronov, Ivan Fedosov] 
 [Jul 27] 
 Spartak Minsk                 0-2  AVANGARD Sormovo                 [aet] 
   [B.Shipunov 98, V.Sysalov 111] 
 [Aug 22] 
 LOKOMOTIV Moskva              3-1  Dinamo Kiev 
   [Vitaliy Artemyev 15, Ivan Morgunov 74, Zaur Kaloyev 75 – Viktor Terentyev 50 pen] 
 [Aug 24] 
 Zenit Leningrad               1-3  TORPEDO Moskva 
   [Valeriy Tsaritsyn ? pen – Yuriy Falin 26, Eduard Streltsov 40, Vitaliy Arbutov ?] 
 [Aug 25] 
 DINAMO Tbilisi                2-1  Dinamo Moskva 
   [Avtandil Chkuaseli 26, Shota Yamanidze 60 – Dmitriy Shapovalov 28] 
 Metallurg Stalinsk            0-6  CSK MO Moskva 
   [Vasiliy Buzunov 16, 27, 31, 87, 90, German Apukhtin 20]

Quarterfinals
 [Aug 21] 
 SPARTAK Moskva                4-2  Spartak Stanislav 
   [Ivan Mozer-2, Igor Netto, Anatoliy Isayev – Chepiga, Goloshchapov] 
 [Aug 31] 
 LOKOMOTIV Moskva              5-2  Avangard Sormovo 
   [Viktor Sokolov-3, Valentin Bubukin, Viktor Voroshilov – Sysalov, Zabelin (L) og] 
 Shakhtyor Stalino             0-1  CSK MO Moskva 
   [Vasiliy Buzunov 40] 
 [Sep 9] 
 TORPEDO Moskva                6-1  Dinamo Tbilisi 
   [Eduard Streltsov 6, 16, 33, ?, 71, Slava Metreveli ? – Nikolai Senyukov (T) 47 og]

Semifinals
 [Oct 19] 
 LOKOMOTIV Moskva              1-0  CSK MO Moskva 
   [Valentin Bubukin 6] 
 [Oct 20] 
 SPARTAK Moskva                1-0  Torpedo Moskva 
   [Nikita Simonyan 59]

Final

External links
 Complete calendar. helmsoccer.narod.ru
 1957 Soviet Cup. Footballfacts.ru
 1957 Soviet football season. RSSSF

Soviet Cup seasons
Cup
Soviet Cup
Soviet Cup